BWI Group, also known as BeijingWest Industries, is a supplier of brake and suspension systems headquartered in  Beijing, China. The company acquired the Chassis Division of Delphi on November 1, 2009. The brake and suspension business lines were purchased for approximately $100 million. The company supplies to automotive, motorcycle, and specialty vehicle manufacturers. BWI Group is an international supplier with manufacturing facilities located in China, Poland, United Kingdom, Czech Republic and Mexico.

History
1909: Dayton Engineering Laboratories Co.
1918: Delco Products
1923: Moraine Products and Inland
1929: Delco Appliance Rochester
1936: Delco Brake
1969: Saginaw Manufacturing
1991: Delco Chassis
1995: Delphi Chassis Systems
2009: Beijing West Industries

Products
BWI Group's product history:
1920s: began to manufacture shock absorbers.
1930s: introduced their drum brake master cylinder
1940s: the all-welded shock absorber was introduced
1960s: the vacuum booster, disc brake and the air adjustable shock became part of the product line
1970s: the brake corner, suspension strut, aluminum master cylinder, and cast iron knuckle added more to the product offerings
1980s: Innovative products were offered, such as: ABS (anti-lock braking system), strut modules, and selectable ride 
1990s: More innovations came in the 1990s with products like: ESC, Real Time Damping, Integrated Chassis, and Aluminum Knuckles. The de Carbon brand was also acquired during this time. 
2000s: MagneRide became one of the company's top brands and ABS applications for motorcycles were also introduced.

References

External links 
 bwigroup.com

Manufacturing companies based in Beijing
Manufacturing companies established in 2009
Chinese companies established in 2009
Automotive industry in China

zh:京西重工国际